Sattam is a 1983 Indian Tamil-language action film directed by K. Vijayan and produced by Anandavalli Balaji, starring Kamal Haasan, Sarath Babu and Madhavi. It is a remake of the Hindi film Dostana (1980). The film was dubbed in Malayalam as Snehabandham.

Cast 
Kamal Haasan as Raja (Inspector)
Madhavi as Radha
Sarath Babu as Ravi (Lawyer)
Y. G. Mahendra as M.L.Anandharaman
Jaishankar as Ramesh
Vijayakumar as Michael johny
K. Balaji as Toni
Manorama as Pandanur Chandirabana
Ilavarasi
Sathyakala
Silk Smitha

Soundtrack 

The music was composed by Gangai Amaran. Tamil lyrics were written by Vaali and Malayalam lyrics written by Poovachal Khader.

References

External links 
 

1983 films
1980s Tamil-language films
1980s action drama films
1980s buddy films
Tamil remakes of Hindi films
Indian action drama films
Indian buddy films
Films scored by Gangai Amaran
Films directed by K. Vijayan
1983 drama films